Arthur Schopenhauer was a German philosopher best known for his work The World as Will and Representation.

Schopenhauer may also refer to:
 7015 Schopenhauer, a main-belt asteroid

People with the surname
 Johanna Schopenhauer (1766–1838), German author, Arthur Schopenhauer's mother
 Adele Schopenhauer (1797–1849), German author, Arthur Schopenhauer's sister
 Vincent Cervoni Schopenhauer or Happy (born 1991), French Counter-Strike player